One third of Harlow District Council in Essex, England, is elected each year, followed by one year when there is an election to Essex County Council instead. Since the last boundary changes in 2002, 33 councillors have been elected from 11 wards.

Political control
Since the first election to the council in 1973 political control of the council has been held by the following parties:

Leadership
The leaders of the council since 2008 have been:

Council elections
Summary of the council composition, click on the year for full details of each election. Boundary changes took place for the 2002 election reducing the number of seats by 9.

District result maps

By-election results
By-elections occur when seats become vacant between council elections. Below is a summary of recent by-elections; full by-election results can be found by clicking on the by-election name.

References

External links
Harlow District Council

 
Council elections in Essex
District council elections in England